Mathias Mester (born 15 September 1986 in Coesfeld) is a Paralympian athlete from Germany competing mainly in category F40 throwing events.

In 2007 the German Disabled Sports Association recognised his achievement and he and cyclist Natalie Simanowski were the Disabled Athletes of the Year.

He competed in the 2008 Summer Paralympics in Beijing, China. There he won a silver medal in the men's F40 shot put event.

Notes

External links
 
 

1986 births
Living people
German male javelin throwers
German male shot putters
Paralympic athletes of Germany
Paralympic silver medalists for Germany
Paralympic medalists in athletics (track and field)
Athletes (track and field) at the 2008 Summer Paralympics
Athletes (track and field) at the 2012 Summer Paralympics
Athletes (track and field) at the 2016 Summer Paralympics
Medalists at the 2008 Summer Paralympics
Competitors in athletics with dwarfism
Recipients of the Silver Laurel Leaf
People from Coesfeld
Sportspeople from Münster (region)
21st-century German people